The Denali Borough is a borough located in the U.S. state of Alaska. As of the 2020 census the population of the borough was 1,619, down from 1,826 in 2010. The borough seat and most populated community is Healy, and its only incorporated place is Anderson. The borough was incorporated in December 1990.

The area was previously a part of the Unorganized Borough, with the Upper Railbelt School District serving as the region's rural education attendance area (which was replaced by a school district under the borough's umbrella upon incorporation).

The earliest inhabitants were nomadic native Alaskans. A mining camp was established near Healy prior to 1902, and construction of the Alaska Railroad brought additional settlers to the area in the early 1920s. Clear Space Force Station, the Usibelli Coal Mine and tourism at the Denali National Park and Preserve have brought growth and development.

Geography

The borough contains North America's highest point: Denali (formerly Mount McKinley), from which it derives its name, at 6,190.5 m (20,310 ft).

National protected area
 Denali National Park and Preserve (part)
 Denali Wilderness (part)

Adjacent boroughs and census areas
 Yukon-Koyukuk Census Area - west/north
 Fairbanks North Star Borough - northeast
 Southeast Fairbanks Census Area - east
 Matanuska-Susitna Borough - south

Demographics

At the 2000 census there were 1,893 people, 785 households, and 452 families residing in the borough.  The population density was 0.148 people per square mile (0.057/km2).  There were 1,351 housing units at an average density of 0.106 per square mile (0.041/km2).  The racial makeup of the borough was 85.74% White, 1.43% Black or African American, 4.75% Native American, 1.53% Asian, 0.37% Pacific Islander, 0.95% from other races, and 5.23% from two or more races.  2.48%. were Hispanic or Latino of any race.

Of the 785 households 31.00% had children under the age of 18 living with them, 48.40% were married couples living together, 4.50% had a female householder with no husband present, and 42.30% were non-families. 35.00% of households were one person and 1.40% were one person aged 65 or older.  The average household size was 2.28 and the average family size was 3.03.

The age distribution was 23.80% under the age of 18, 6.70% from 18 to 24, 36.80% from 25 to 44, 29.70% from 45 to 64, and 3.10% 65 or older.  The median age was 38 years. For every 100 females, there were 139.00 males.  For every 100 females age 18 and over, there were 147.10 males.

Denali Borough is the 63rd highest-income county in the United States, and highest-income county in Alaska, by personal per capita income .

2020 Census

Politics

Communities

City
 Anderson
 Clear
 Clear AFS

Census-designated places
 Cantwell
 Denali Park
 Ferry
 Healy

Other unincorporated communities
 Kantishna
 Suntrana
 Usibelli

Historical locations
 Diamond

Popular culture
In the Twilight Saga by Stephenie Meyer, the Denali vampire coven (consisting of Tanya, Kate, Irina, Eleazar and Carmen and later Garrett) lives in Denali because of the lack of sunlight.

The film Into the Wild, based on a book of the same name, featured a bus where Christopher McCandless died became a destination for film fans. The 1940s bus was taken to a remote trail about 60 years ago (from 2020) by a road crew, according to Denali Borough Mayor, Clay Walker. Visitors to the site had to cross the Teklanika River. In 2019 a newlywed Belarusian woman drowned trying to cross the swollen river on her way to the site. Another drowning took place in 2010. A stranded Brazilian had to be rescued in April 2020 and five Italians were rescued in February 2020, with one suffering from severe frostbite. In total 15 bus-related search and rescue operations for visitors to the bus were carried out between 2009 and 2017. In June 2020 the bus was removed because of public safety concerns. It was air-lifted by a US army Chinook helicopter. Alaskan authorities are quoted as saying the bus would be kept in a "secure location" until a decision is made about its future. Clay Walker said, "It (the bus) is part of our history and it does feel a little bittersweet to see a piece of our history go down the road."

See also

 List of airports in the Denali Borough
 National Register of Historic Places listings in Denali Borough, Alaska

References

External links

 Official website

 
1990 establishments in Alaska
Populated places established in 1990